Juliet E. McKenna (born 1965) is a British fantasy author with over fifteen epic fantasy novels.

Biography
McKenna was born in Lincolnshire in 1965, and studied Greek and Roman history and literature at St Hilda's College, Oxford. After college McKenna had a career in personnel management before a changing to work in book-selling. She also fitted in becoming a mother around her writing. McKenna is one of the British boom of fantasy writers. As well as her various novel series McKenna writes articles and reviews for magazines. She has worked as a judge for various awards such as the Arthur C. Clarke Award in 2013, the 2011 James White Award and the World Fantasy Awards in 2018. McKenna is also a contributing editor for the Irish anthology magazine Albedo One. In 2013 McKenna was the chair of the British National Science Fiction Convention, EightSquaredCon.

She was also one of the authors, along with others such as Sarah Ash and Mark Chadbourn, behind  The Write Fantastic, which was an initiative by a group of fantasy authors to promote the fantasy genre, and to display the scope of current fantasy writing.
McKenna joined forces with a group of micro business owners to  form EU VAT ACTION resolve the VAT issue caused by the EU VAT regulations which came into force on 1 January 2015. She spent considerable time working with businesses and experts in the UK and EU to create a way that small businesses online could work with the VAT regulations.

She regularly attends fantasy conventions and hosted FantasyCon 2015's awards night, gives talks, and teaches creative writing courses.

Critical reception
Financial Times reviewer James Lovegrove described McKenna's 2012 She-who-thinks-for-herself, as "a cunning, funny... feminist rewrite" of H. Rider Haggard's She: A History of Adventure.

Awards

 The Karl Edward Wagner award for special achievement (FantasyCon 2015).
British Fantasy Award nominee for best fantasy novel (2019).

Bibliography

Novels

The Tales of Einarinn 
 The Thief's Gamble (1999)
 The Swordsman's Oath (1999)
 The Gambler's Fortune (2000)
 The Warrior's Bond (2001)
 The Assassin's Edge (2002)

The Aldabreshin Compass 
 Southern Fire (2003)
 Northern Storm (2004)
 Western Shore (2005)
 Eastern Tide (2006)

The Chronicles of the Lescari Revolution
 Irons in the Fire (2009)
 Blood in the Water (2010)
 Banners in the Wind (2010)

The Hadrumal Crisis

 Dangerous Waters (2011)
 Darkening Skies (2012)
 Defiant Peaks (2012)

The Green Man
 The Green Man’s Heir (2018)
 The Green Man’s Foe (2019)
 The Green Man’s Silence (2020)
 The Green Man’s Challenge (2021)

Standalone novels

 Shadow Histories of the River Kingdom (2016)

Other fiction

Short stories

 Losing Track of Time (2003) (a Big Finish Short Trips story)
 Urban Renewal (2006)
 Identify Theft (2006)
 Now You See Him, Now You Don’t (2006)
 The Wizard’s Coming (2007) (in The Solaris Book of New Fantasy)
 Walking Shadows (2008)
 Noble Deceit (2008)
 Is This My Last Testament? (2008)
 Patience: A Womanly Virtue (2009)
 Reflections (2010)
 Fear Itself (2010)
 The Grand Tour (2010)
 An Unforeseen Legacy (2010)
 The Wisdom of the Ages (2011)  (in Voices From The Past)
 She-who-thinks-for-herself (2012) (in Resurrection Engines: Sixteen Extraordinary Tales of Scientific Romance)
 Remembrance  (2010)
 An Unforeseen Legacy  (2011)
 Game, Set and Match (2013)
 The Legend of the Eagle (2013)
 The Ties That Bind (2013)
 Do You Want to Believe in Magic? (2014)
 Coins, Fights and Stories Always (2015)
 Notes and Queries (2015)
 Truth, Lies and Consequences (2015)
 A Warning Shiver (2016)
 Speak Softly and Carry a Big Stick (2016)
 The Sphere (2016)
 Through the Veils/Trace Elements (2016)
 A Constant Companion (2017)
 The Road to Hadrumal (2017)

Short fiction featuring characters from The Tales of Einarinn

 The Tormalin Necklace (2001)
 The Wedding Gift (2003) (illustrated)
 Turns and Chances (2004) (novella)
 Win Some, Lose Some (2005)
 A Spark in the Darkness (2006)
 A Few Further Tales of Einnarin (2012) (electronic publication collecting "The Wedding Gift", "Win Some, Lose Some", "A Spark in the Darkness", "Absent Friends", "Why the Pied Crow Always Sounds Disappointed" [which had originally been published as The Tormalin Necklace] and the illustrations from "The Wedding Gift")

References

External links
 
Destiny: destiny is a choice, Utrecht University Thesis

The Write Fantastic
REVIEW : Juliet E McKenna - Defiant Peaks (The Hadrumal Crisis Book 3)

1965 births
English fantasy writers
Living people
Alumni of St Hilda's College, Oxford
English women novelists
British women short story writers
English short story writers
Writers from Lincolnshire
20th-century English novelists
20th-century British short story writers
20th-century English women writers
21st-century English novelists
21st-century British short story writers
21st-century English women writers
Women science fiction and fantasy writers